Styrax cordatus is a species of plant in the family Styracaceae. It is native to Peru and Ecuador.

References

cordatus
Flora of Peru
Flora of Ecuador
Taxonomy articles created by Polbot
Taxobox binomials not recognized by IUCN